Liuzza or Liuzzo may refer to:

 Gayle Liuzza, political figure from Wilmer, Louisiana
 Roy Liuzza, American scholar of Old English literature
 Viola Liuzzo (1925–1965), American Unitarian Universalist civil rights activist